Harry Dijksma (born March 12, 1951) is a Dutch politician of the People's Party for Freedom and Democracy (VVD). He is a Representative of Flevoland for the States Deputed.

References

1951 births
Living people
Members of the Provincial-Executive of Flevoland
People's Party for Freedom and Democracy politicians
Delft University of Technology alumni
Erasmus University Rotterdam alumni
People from Hilversum